Clara Lamore (July 2, 1926 – April 2, 2021), also known by her married name Clara Lamore Walker, was an American competition swimmer who represented the United States at the 1948 Summer Olympics in London.  LaMore competed in the preliminary heats of the women's 200-meter breaststroke and recorded a time of 3:23.6.

Lamore won the AAU breaststroke titles over 200 m (outdoor, 1945), 100 yd (indoor, 1947), and 220 yd (indoor, 1948). She semi-retired from swimming after the 1948 Olympics, worked for New England Telephone, then would become a nun, in The Sisters of the Cenacle. In 1964, Lamore was one of the first two women to graduate from Providence College. She later became a teacher and guidance counselor at Western Hills Middle School in Cranston, Rhode Island. By 1980 she developed chronic back pain and resumed swimming upon advice from a doctor. She became the most decorated master swimmer of all time, setting more than 180 world and 465 American records. She was selected the Outstanding Masters Swimmer in her age group for eight consecutive years and was inducted into the International Swimming Hall of Fame in 1995.

Lamore was born into a U.S. postman's family. She learned to swim in 1941, and during her early career was trained by her mother Irene. She married the Naval officer Donald Walker, and for seven years lived with him in Europe until his sudden death in 1970. LaMore died in April 2021 at the age of 94.

See also
 List of members of the International Swimming Hall of Fame

References

External links

1926 births
2021 deaths
American female breaststroke swimmers
Olympic swimmers of the United States
Sportspeople from Providence, Rhode Island
Swimmers at the 1948 Summer Olympics
21st-century American women